Heinrich von Bülow may refer to:

 Heinrich von Bülow (diplomat) (1792–1846), Prussian statesman
 Heinrich von Bülow (Grotekop), 14th--century knight